The 1916 North Carolina A&M Aggies football team represented the North Carolina A&M Aggies of North Carolina College of Agriculture and Mechanic Arts during the 1916 college football season. North Carolina A&M was also whipped, 61–5, by Georgetown in the worst defeat in school history up to that point. The Aggies were outscored 191 to 24 against their seven opponents. They finished last in the South Atlantic Intercollegiate Athletic Association (SAIAA), losing to all four of their conference opponents by a total point margin of 128 to 5.

Schedule

References

North Carolina AandM
NC State Wolfpack football seasons
North Carolina AandM Aggies football